Harpalus rufiscapus is a species of ground beetle in the subfamily Harpalinae. It was described by Gebler in 1833.

References

rufiscapus
Beetles described in 1833